Taking On the World is the debut album from Scottish rock band Gun, released on 5 July 1989.

The album peaked at number 44 in the UK charts, and produced two UK Top 40 singles, "Better Days" and "Shame on You". Three other singles were released, "Money (Everybody Loves Her)", "Inside Out" and the title track "Taking On the World". All three made the UK Top 100.

The album received positive reviews upon release, including a five-star review from Kerrang! magazine, and sold over 60,000 copies. In September 2010 the album was included in Classic Rock magazine's list of the 150 Greatest Debut Albums of All Time.

To celebrate the album's 25th anniversary, it was reissued in October 2014 as a three-disc Deluxe Edition comprising the original album, B-sides, rarities, covers and BBC Sessions recordings.

In 2019, Gun celebrated the 30th anniversary of the album by embarking on "The Big 3-0 Tour", where they played the album in its entirety.

Track listing

Personnel 
Adapted credits from the media notes of the 2014 reissue of Taking On the World.
 Mark Rankin – Vocals
 Giuliano Gizzi – Guitar
 Baby Stafford – Guitar
 Dante Gizzi – Bass
 Scott Shields – Drums

Additional musicians
 Sharleen Spiteri – Backing vocals (tracks 2, 10)
 Scott Fraser – Bass (tracks 7, 9)
 Alan Thornton – Backing vocals
 David Aitken – Guitar
 Jim McDermott – Drums

Charts

Certifications

References

1989 debut albums
Gun (band) albums
A&M Records albums